Patricia Harris (born September 1, 1956) is the chief executive officer of Michael Bloomberg's philanthropic foundation, Bloomberg Philanthropies. She was first deputy mayor for the City of New York from 2002 to December 31, 2013. She advised the Mayor of New York City, then Bloomberg, on administrative, operational, and policy matters. As of 2016, she was listed as the 87th most powerful woman in the world by Forbes.

Early life and education

Born in 1956 and raised in New York City, Harris became interested in public service in high school, when she volunteered in then Congressman Ed Koch’s office.

In 1977, Harris graduated from Franklin & Marshall College with a Bachelor of Arts degree in Government. Franklin and Marshall's Harris Center for Business, Government, and Public Policy was donated in her name in 2009, and she has served on the college's Board of Trustees since 2006.

Career

In 1977, Harris began her public service career as an assistant to Congressman Koch. Upon Koch's election as Mayor, she became an Assistant to the deputy mayor in 1979, and subsequently was appointed Assistant to the mayor for Federal Affairs. From 1983 to 1990, she served as executive director of the City's Art Commission.

Following her work with the Koch Administration, Harris served as vice president for Public Relations at Serino Coyne Advertising before joining Bloomberg LP in 1994, where she managed Bloomberg LP's Philanthropy, Public Relations, and Governmental Affairs divisions. Harris is generally credited with introducing founder Michael Bloomberg to the worlds of art and philanthropy.

Harris joined Michael Bloomberg's administration when he was elected mayor in 2001, serving first as deputy mayor for Administration until 2005, when she was appointed first deputy mayor. Harris was the first woman in New York City's history to serve in this role. Harris is known as a key trusted adviser to Bloomberg, and she weighs in on every major policy or personnel decision.

Crain's Business New York named Patti Harris the fourth most powerful woman in New York City in 2013 and, according to a New York Times profile, she was the most powerful person in the Bloomberg administration.

Harris currently serves as the chief executive officer of Bloomberg Philanthropies. Harris oversaw Bloomberg's philanthropic giving, which he valued as a key component of his legacy. Michael Bloomberg, a billionaire, has pledged to give away all of his wealth. As of 2016, she is listed as the 87th most powerful woman in the world by Forbes.

Professional recognition and awards 
 "Manhattan Borough 50" (City & State NY): On October 3, 2016, City & State New York listed Harris as #32 in its list of 50 people with the greatest impact on the economy, development, and culture of Manhattan, NY. The article cited her support for improving education, the environment, and the arts in New York City and around the world.
 "The World's Most Powerful Women" (Forbes): Harris was listed at #87 on Forbess 2016 list of "The World’s Most Powerful Women." Forbes cited her stewardship of Bloomberg Philanthropies' global initiatives and distribution of $510 million in charitable giving in 2015, as well as her previous roles in New York City government and business. Harris was also listed in the 2015 edition of the Forbes list.
 "50 Most Powerful Women in U.S. Philanthropy" (Inside Philanthropy): On March 10, 2016, Inside Philanthropy included Harris among its list of the “50 Most Powerful Women in US Philanthropy.” The list recognized Harris's work to expand Bloomberg Philanthropies' annual giving, mission, and global reach since its founding in 2010.
 "Most Powerful Women in New York" (Crain's New York Business): Harris has been listed among Crain's "Most Powerful Women in New York" in each of the past four biannual lists. She has been cited for her work leading Bloomberg Philanthropies and the Mayor's Fund to Advance NYC, as well as her previous work as Deputy Mayor of New York. Most recently, she was listed at #32 in 2015.
 New York Daily News: On November 16, 2009, the NY Daily News described Harris as the "most powerful woman in New York that you've never heard of," based on her long tenure alongside Mike Bloomberg working to guide his philanthropic and government initiatives.

Personal life

Harris is married to attorney Mark Lebow, a member of the Metropolitan Transportation Authority’s board.

References

1956 births
Living people
Deputy mayors of New York City
Franklin & Marshall College alumni
Women in New York (state) politics
21st-century American women